The Emir Assaf Mosque is a mosque located in downtown Beirut, Lebanon.

History
This mosque was inaugurated by Emir Mansur Assaf in 1597, on the former Serail Square that hosted Emir Fakhreddine’s palace and celebrated gardens. The Old Serail and the bath complex were replaced by Souk Sursock in the 1880s, while the Bab al-Saraya gate was removed in 1915 to make way for the new Foch-Allenby commercial district. In 1934, the mosque’s ablution rooms were built on the west side, in alignment with the street leading to Etoile Square. Post-war restoration of the mid-1990s lead to the renovation of the original western façade of the mosque.

Architecture
The square shape of the mosque, its five-cupola roof, the ablaq decoration of the entrance and the fine muqarnass detailing of the windows are characteristic of Lebanese style. Gray granite Roman columns support the central dome in the mosque's prayer hall. There was a bath complex located opposite the mosque, and the city gate known as Bab al-Saraya.

See also
 Foch-Allenby District

References 
 Al-Wali, Sheikh Mohammad Taha (1973) Tarikh al-masajid wal jawami’ al-sharifa fi Bayrout, Dar al-Kotob, Beirut.
 Hallaq, Hassan (1987) Al-tarikh alijtima'i wa al-siyasi wa al-iqtisadi fi Bayrut, [Social, Political and Economic History of Beirut], Dar al-Jami'at, Beirut.
 Hallaq, Hassan (1987) Bayrut al-mahrousa fil'ahd al-'uthmâni, [Beirut during the Ottoman Period], Dar al-Jami'at, Beirut.

Buildings and structures in Beirut
Monuments and memorials in Lebanon
Mosques in Beirut
Tourist attractions in Beirut
Religious buildings and structures completed in 1597